Colonel Roger McElligott (died after 1714) was an Irish Jacobite soldier and politician.

McElligott raised a regiment in County Kerry for James II of England, which was located at Hampton Court in 1688. That year McElligott and his regiment returned to Ireland. Following the Glorious Revolution, McElligott was the Member of Parliament for Ardfert in the brief Patriot Parliament called by James in 1689. In 1690 he was appointed Governor of Cork, in which capacity he surrendered the city to Williamite forces following the Siege of Cork.

McElligott was taken prisoner and imprisoned in the Tower of London until June 1697, when he was released. He travelled immediately to France, where he became colonel of the Regiment of Clancarty in the Irish Brigade. The regiment was present at the Siege of Barcelona in 1713–14. It is unknown when or where McElligott died, although he likely remained in French service for the rest of his life.

References

Year of birth unknown
Year of death unknown
17th-century Irish people
18th-century Irish people
French military personnel of the War of the Spanish Succession
Irish Jacobites
Irish MPs 1689
Irish soldiers in the army of James II of England
Irish soldiers in the French Army
Members of the Parliament of Ireland (pre-1801) for County Kerry constituencies
Prisoners in the Tower of London